Trảng Dài is a ward located in Biên Hòa city of Đồng Nai province, Vietnam. It has an area of about 14.4km2 and the population in 2018 was 55,189.

References

Bien Hoa